Niche Syndrome (Niche シンドローム) is the fourth studio album by Japanese rock band One Ok Rock, released on June 9, 2010. It was released as a normal CD-only edition and a limited CD+DVD edition. This album includes the group's single "Kanzen Kankaku Dreamer", which was released earlier in 2010. This was the first album that did not feature original lead guitarist Alex Onizawa.

The song from the album, "Wherever You Are", peaked at #4 on the Billboard Japan Hot 100 and stayed for 89 weeks. The song was used on NTT Docomo's phone commercial series, "Kazoku-hen". Their single "Kanzen Kankaku Dreamer" peaked at #40 on the Billboard Japan Hot 100 and stayed on the chart for 18 weeks.

The release of Niche Syndrome was followed by a Zepp Tour titled One Ok Rock "This Is My Own Judgement" Tour, spanning from June 27 through July 23, 2010.

Track listing

Notes
 : "Introduction" is an instrumental song.
 : "Wherever You Are" was written by Moriuchi for his friend's wedding.
 : "Nobody's Home" is about Moriuchi's apology and gratitude straightforwardly for his parents Shinichi Mori and Masako Mori.

Personnel
Credits adapted from the liner notes of Niche Syndrome.

One Ok Rock
 Takahiro "Taka" Moriuchi — lead vocals
 Toru Yamashita — guitar, backing vocals
 Ryota Kohama — bass guitar
 Tomoya Kanki — drums

Production 
 Hideki Kodera — recording
 Satoru Hiraide — recording, mixing
 Satoshi Hosoi — recording, mixing
 Kensuke Miura — recording
 Ian Cooper —  mastering 
 Miki Nagashima — assistant engineer
 Naoki Iwata — assistant engineer
 Hideaki Ikawa — assistant engineer
 Norikatsu Teruuchi — assistant engineer
 Masanori Hata — assistant engineer
 Ryota Hattanda — assistant engineer
 Takeshi Baba — assistant engineer
 Kazutaka Minemori —  instrument technician
 Yoshiro "Masuo" Arimatsu —  instrument technician
 Yukifumi Kaneko —  instrument technician
 Kyohei Meguro —  instrument technician

Design
 Kazuaki Seki — art direction
 Daichi Shiono —  design

Charts

Weekly charts

Year-end charts

Singles

Other charted songs

Certifications

References

External links 
 

2010 albums
One Ok Rock albums
A-Sketch albums
Alternative rock albums by Japanese artists